The 2019–20 season was Konyaspor's 98th year in existence. In addition to the domestic league, Konyaspor participated in the Turkish Cup.

Squad

Süper Lig

League table

Results summary

Results by round

Matches

References
 

Konyaspor seasons
Turkish football clubs 2019–20 season